Archie Campbell (born 10 January 1991) is a Scottish footballer who plays for Crossgates Primrose.

Campbell started his career at Rangers, but left to join Morton after seven years at Ibrox. He also had a loan spell at Cowdenbeath where he scored five league goals as they failed to avoid relegation.

Club career

Campbell started his career with Cowdenbeath in 2007, having been with the club since the age of 13.

Cowdenbeath loan
Campbell joined First Division club Cowdenbeath in the 2011 January transfer window on loan until the end of the season. He quickly established himself in the first team squad with three goals in his opening few games – two penalties and a header in a thrilling 4–3. win away to Stirling Albion – Cowden were three goals down with 13 minutes to play but fought back to win.

Greenock Morton
Campbell was released by Rangers at the end of the 2010–11 season, but joined Greenock Morton after a successful trial. After 17 substitute appearances, Campbell made his first start for Morton on Boxing Day 2011 away at Dens Park against Dundee, setting up the only goal of the game.

In his second start, he scored his first league goal and got another assist, as Morton defeated Ayr United 3–1 at Cappielow.

On 1 September 2012, he scored his first professional hat-trick against Dumbarton to win the game 3–0.

After scoring seven goals in five matches, Campbell was awarded the SFL Young Player of the Month and the Irn-Bru Ginger Boots as top goalscorer in the SFL. In May 2013, Campbell signed on with Morton for another season, rejecting a more lucrative deal at Raith Rovers to do so.

Dumbarton
On 22 July it was announced that Campbell had joined Dumbarton on a one-year deal. He made his debut as a sub in a 3–2 defeat to Stranraer. Archie scored his first goal for the club against Alloa in a 3–1 win. He left the club in May 2015 having scored three times in 38 appearances.

Clyde & Non League
He joined League Two side Clyde following his release from Dumbarton in May 2015 before moving on to Kelty Hearts in February 2016. After leaving Kelty he joined Dundonald Bluebell in November 2017. Campbell returned to Kelty in March 2019, Before moving on to East of Scotland side Crossgates Primrose in September.

International
Campbell has been capped for Scotland at both under-17 and under-19 level.

Career statistics

A.  The "Other" column constitutes appearances (including substitutes) and goals in the Scottish Challenge Cup.

Personal
SFL Young Player of the Month – September 2012
SFL Ginger Boot – September 2012
SFL Player of the Month – October 2012

See also
Greenock Morton F.C. season 2011–12 | 2012–13 | 2013–14

References

External links

1991 births
Living people
Footballers from Dunfermline
Scottish footballers
Association football forwards
Rangers F.C. players
Cowdenbeath F.C. players
Greenock Morton F.C. players
Dumbarton F.C. players
Clyde F.C. players
Kelty Hearts F.C. players
Scottish Football League players
People educated at Beath High School
Scotland youth international footballers
Scottish Professional Football League players
Scottish Junior Football Association players